Sloe gin is a British red liqueur made with gin and sloes. Sloes are the fruit (drupe) of Prunus spinosa, the blackthorn plant, a relative of the plum. Sloe gin has an alcohol content between 15 and 30 percent by volume. However, the European Union has established a minimum of 25% ABV for sloe gin to be named as such. Sloe gin is technically a gin-based liqueur, but due to historical prevalence at the time of writing the EU spirit drink regulations, the colloquial name 'sloe gin' was included in the legal definitions and as such is the only gin-based liqueur that can legally be called gin without the liqueur suffix. The traditional way of making sloe gin is to soak the sloes in gin. Most recipes call for the addition of sugar, but this is not required. The drink develops sweetness when the fruit is left in the alcohol and is allowed to mature. The addition of sugar is actually likely to inhibit the passage of flavour compounds from the fruit into the spirit, due to a reduction in osmotic pressure; a common criticism of sloe gin is that it is much too sweet.

Many commercial sloe gins today are made by flavouring less expensive neutral grain spirits, although some manufacturers still use the traditional method. US distilleries often use close relatives of the sloe, such as the beach plum, or more distant ones such as the Aronia berry, to produce a domestic version of sloe gin.

Manufacture
Sloe gin is made from ripe sloes, which are traditionally picked after the first frost of winter (late October to early November in the northern hemisphere). Each sloe is pricked, traditionally with a thorn taken from the blackthorn bush on which they grow. An alternative folktale says that one should not prick the sloes with a metal fork unless it is made of silver. A modern variation is to pick the sloes earlier and freeze them overnight, to mimic the effects of frost.

The jar is then filled with gin, sealed, turned several times to mix and stored in a cool, dark place. It is turned every day for the first two weeks, then each week, until at least three months have passed.

The gin will now have a deep ruby red colour. The liqueur is poured off and the sloes discarded, or infused in white wine or cider, made into jam, or used as a basis for a chutney or a filling for liqueur chocolates. The liqueur can be filtered or decanted back into clean containers and left to stand for another week.  Careful decanting can eliminate almost all sediment, leaving a red liqueur that is not cloudy.

Recipes for sloe gin vary depending on the maker's taste. The sweetness can be adjusted to taste at the end of the process, although sufficient sugar is required while the fruit is steeped to ensure full extraction of flavour. When made sufficiently slowly, the alcohol extracts an almond-like essence from the sloes' stones, giving sloe gin a particular aromatic flavour. However, some recipes use a shorter steeping time and include a small amount of almond essence. Another common variation is the addition of a few cloves and a small stick of cinnamon.

In North Yorkshire, Masons Gin distills the sloe berries in the gin as opposed to the traditional infusing the berries in the gin after distillation.

UK competitions
A sloe gin competition is held each January in The Pandy Inn, Dorstone, Herefordshire,  with the winner crowned the "Grand Master of the Sloes". There were 30 Sloe Gins entered in the 2015 competition. They were sampled and scored on colour, clarity, taste and quality by more than 50 judges.

There are also the Sloe Gin Awards in Hebden Bridge, West Yorkshire, which are held annually and include gold, silver and bronze awards.

The George Inn in Frant, East Sussex, near Royal Tunbridge Wells, plays host to the annual Sloe Gin World Championships in December.

Related liqueurs
In Germany and other German-speaking countries, Schlehenlikör (de) is made by soaking sloes, sugar, and possibly some spices in vodka, gin or rum.

In Spain,  is made by soaking sloes in an anise-flavoured spirit, resulting in a light reddish-brown, sweet liquid, around 25–30% alcohol by volume.

In Italy,  is made by soaking sloes with sugar and spices in spirit alcohol (recipe varies locally), resulting a reddish, sweet liquor, around 40–45% alcohol by volume; it is often chilled before serving.

In Poland,  is an infusion of sloes in vodka or rectified spirit.
 
Slider is still cider in which the sloes used to make sloe gin have been steeped; it is a tradition of Devonshire in the UK. Sloe whisky and sloe brandy are variants on the tradition, and are often mixed with ginger beer or ginger ale.

See also

 Damson gin
 
 Prunus spinosa
 Sloe Gin Fizz
 Umeshu
 Vodka infusion
 Sloe Gin, a song on Tim Curry's 1978 album Read My Lips, later covered by Joe Bonamassa

References

British liqueurs
Berry liqueurs
Gins
Amaretto liqueurs
Plum dishes